Make Way for Tomorrow is a 1937 American drama film directed by Leo McCarey. The plot concerns an elderly couple (played by Victor Moore and Beulah Bondi) who are forced to separate when they lose their house and none of their five children will take both parents.

The film was written by Viña Delmar, from a play by Helen and Noah Leary, which was in turn based on the novel The Years Are So Long by advice columnist Josephine Lawrence. McCarey viewed the film as his best, and it has been praised by later critics. In 2010, it was released selected for preservation by the United States Library of Congress's National Film Registry.

Plot
Barkley "Bark" (Victor Moore) and Lucy Cooper (Beulah Bondi) are an elderly couple who lose their home to foreclosure, as Barkley has been unable to find employment because of his age. They summon four of their five children—the fifth lives thousands of miles away in California—to break the news and decide where they will live until they can get back on their feet. Only one of the children, Nell (Minna Gombell), has enough space for both, but she asks for three months to talk her husband into the idea. In the meantime, the temporary solution is for the parents to split up and each live with a different child.

The two burdened families soon come to find their parents' presence bothersome. Nell's efforts to talk her husband into helping are half-hearted and achieve no success, and she reneges on her promise to eventually take them. While Barkley continues looking for work to allow him and his wife to live independently again, he has little or no prospect of success. When Lucy continues to speak optimistically of the day that he will find work, her teenage granddaughter bluntly advises her to "face facts" that it will never happen because of his age. Lucy's sad reply is to say that "facing facts" is easy for a carefree 17-year-old girl, but that at Lucy's age, the only fun left is "pretending that there ain't any facts to face ... so would you mind if I just kind of went on pretending?"

With no end in sight to the uncomfortable living situations, both host families look for a way to get the parent they are hosting out of their house. When Barkley catches a cold, his daughter Cora (Elisabeth Risdon) seizes upon it as a pretext to assert that his health demands a milder climate, thus necessitating that he move to California to live with his daughter Addie.

Meanwhile, son George (Thomas Mitchell) and his wife Anita (Fay Bainter) begin planning to move Lucy into a retirement home. Lucy accidentally finds out about their plans, but rather than force George into the awkward position of breaking the news to her, she goes to him first and claims that she wants to move into the home. Meanwhile, Barkley resigns himself to his fate of having to move thousands of miles away, though he too is entirely aware of his daughter's true motivation.

On the day Barkley is to depart by train, he and Lucy make plans to go out and spend one last afternoon together before having a farewell dinner with the four children. They have a fantastic time strolling around the city and reminiscing about their happy years together, even visiting the same hotel in which they had stayed on their honeymoon 50 years prior. Their day is made so pleasant partly because of the kindness of people they encounter, who, although strangers, seem to find them a charming couple, to genuinely enjoy their company, and to treat them with deference and respect—in stark contrast to the treatment the two are receiving from their children.

Eventually Barkley and Lucy decide to continue their wonderful day by skipping the farewell dinner and dining at the hotel instead; when Barkley informs their daughter with a blunt phone call, it prompts introspection among the four children. Son Robert (Ray Meyer) suggests that each of the children has always known that collectively they are "probably the most good-for-nothing bunch of kids that were ever raised, but it didn't bother us much until we found out that Pop knew it too." George notes that it is now so late in the evening that they won't even have time to meet their parents at the train station to send off their father. He says that he deliberately let the time pass until it was too late because he figured their parents would prefer to be alone. Nell objects that if they don't go to the station, their parents "will think we're terrible," to which George matter-of-factly replies, "Aren't we?"

At the train station, Lucy and Barkley say their farewells to one another. On the surface, their conversation echoes Lucy's comments to her granddaughter about preferring to pretend, rather than facing facts. Barkley tells Lucy that he will find a job in California and quickly send for her; Lucy replies that she is sure he will do so.

They then offer each other a truly final goodbye, saying that they are doing so "just in case" they do not see each other again because "anything could happen." Each makes a heartfelt statement reaffirming their lifelong love, in what seems an unspoken acknowledgment that it is almost certainly their final moment together. Barkley boards the train, and Lucy and he acknowledge each other and wave through the closed window as the train pulls away. A somber Lucy turns from the scene.

Cast

Production
Victor Moore and Beulah Bondi, who played "Pa" and "Ma", respectively, were both relatively young actors who wore make-up to appear older.

Reception
Writing for Night and Day in 1937, Graham Greene gave the film a neutral review, summarizing it as "a depressing picture about an old couple". Greene noted that the overall effect the audience receives is "a sense of misery and inhumanity ... left vibrating in the nerves", and commented that the description from Paramount gave a distinctly different expectation of the actual film.

McCarey himself believed that it was his finest film. When he accepted his Academy Award for Best Director for The Awful Truth, which was released the same year, he said, "Thanks, but you gave it to me for the wrong picture."

Make Way for Tomorrow earned good reviews when originally released in Japan, where it was seen by screenwriter Kogo Noda. Years later, it provided an inspiration for the script of Tokyo Story (1953), written by Noda and director Yasujirō Ozu.

Orson Welles said of the film, "It would make a stone cry," and rhapsodized about his enthusiasm for the film in his 1992 book-length series of interviews with Peter Bogdanovich. In Newsweek magazine, famed documentary filmmaker Errol Morris named it his #1 film, stating "The most depressing movie ever made, providing reassurance that everything will definitely end badly."
Roger Ebert added this film to his "Great Movies" list on February 11, 2010, writing:"Make Way for Tomorrow" (1937) is a nearly-forgotten American film made in the Depression ... The great final arc of "Make Way for Tomorrow" is beautiful and heartbreaking. It's easy to imagine it being sentimentalized by a studio executive, being made more upbeat for the audience. That's not McCarey. What happens is wonderful and very sad. Everything depends on the performances.

Also in February 2010, the film was released by the Criterion Collection, whose website describes it asone of the great unsung Hollywood masterpieces, an enormously moving Depression-era depiction of the frustrations of family, aging, and the generation gap ... Make Way for Tomorrow is among American cinema's purest tearjerkers, all the way to its unflinching ending, which McCarey refused to change despite studio pressure.In interviews filmed for the Criterion release, Gary Giddins and Peter Bogdanovich summarize the film's message as to be kind to others, especially ones' family or elders. Giddins posits that, without being political, the film provides an argument for Social Security (which was being implemented in the United States at the time of the film's release). Both Giddins and Bogdanovich argue that the film avoided derogatory ethnic stereotypes by humanizing the supporting characters of the Black maid and the Jewish merchant.

In late 2010, the film was selected for preservation in the United States National Film Registry by the Library of Congress as being "culturally, historically, or aesthetically" significant.

See also

 Tokyo Story (1953)
 Baghban (2003)

References

External links
 

 
 
 
Make Way for Tomorrow: Make Way for Lucy... an essay by Tag Gallagher at the Criterion Collection
Make Way for Tomorrow essay by Daniel Eagan In America's Film Legacy, 2009-2010: A Viewer's Guide To The 50 Landmark Movies Added To The National Film Registry In 2009–10, Bloomsbury Publishing USA, 2011,  pages  52-55 

1937 films
1937 drama films
American drama films
American black-and-white films
Films scored by Victor Young
Films scored by George Antheil
Films about old age
Films based on American novels
Films based on adaptations
American films based on plays
Films directed by Leo McCarey
Films set in New York City
Paramount Pictures films
United States National Film Registry films
1930s English-language films
1930s American films